Fenner Albert Chace Jr. (October 5, 1908 – May 30, 2004) was an American carcinologist.

Life
Fenner Albert Chace Jr. was born in Fall River, Massachusetts. He attended Harvard University, and received his doctorate in 1934, and became a curator at that university's Museum of Comparative Zoology. After the start of World War II, he worked as a civilian for the Army Air Force oceanographic group, and later commissioned as an officer. His unit was dismantled, and he was reassigned to the US Navy Hydrographic Office. He worked to produce cloth survival charts to be used by aviators lost at sea. After the war, he succeeded Waldo L. Schmitt at the United States National Museum. He worked at the National Museum until his retirement in 1978, and then he continued as Zoologist Emeritus. He was "one of the most influential carcinologists of the 20th century", and named 200 taxa in the Decapoda and Stomatopoda, most of them shrimp.

Taxa
Taxa named by Fenner A. Chace include:

Atyopsis Chace, 1983
Eunephrops cadenasi Chace, 1939
Palaemonetes cummingi Chace, 1954
Physetocaris Chace, 1940
Physetocaris microphthalma Chace, 1940
Potamonautes choloensis (Chace, 1953)
Potamonautes idjiwiensis (Chace, 1942)
Potamonautes montivagus (Chace, 1953)
Potamonautes mutandensis (Chace, 1942)
Procarididae Chace & Manning, 1972
Procaridoidea Chace & Manning, 1972
Procaris Chace & Manning, 1972
Procaris ascensionis Chace & Manning, 1972
Psalidopus barbouri Chace, 1939
Tetrasquilla Manning & Chace, 1990
Typhlatya monae Chace, 1954
Typhlatya rogersi Chace & Manning, 1972

Chace is commemorated in a number of names of taxa:

Alpheus fenneri A. J. Bruce, 1994
Archaeatya chacei Villalobos, 1960
Chacella A. J. Bruce, 1986
Chaceon fenneri (Manning & Holthuis, 1984)
Chorocaris chacei (Williams & Rona, 1986)
Crassispira chacei Hertlein & Strong, 1951
Dicranodromia chacei Guinot, 1995
Fennera chacei Holthuis, 1951
Fenneralpheus chacei Felder & Manning, 1986
Fenneropenaeus Perez Farfante, 1969
Hymenopenaeus chacei Crosnier & Forest, 1969
Ifanella chacei Vervoort, 1964
Ischnochiton chaceorum P. Kaas & R. A. Van Belle, 1990
Michelopagurus chacei McLaughlin, 1997
Pasiphaea chacei Yaldwyn, 1962
Plesionika chacei Crosnier, 1986
Pylocheles chacei Forest, 1987
Scyllarus chacei Holthuis, 1960
Vetericaris chaceorum Kensley & Williams, 1986

The shrimp genus Janicea (currently in the family Barbouriidae) is named after Chace's wife, Janice.

References

American carcinologists
1908 births
2004 deaths
Harvard University alumni
People from Fall River, Massachusetts
Scientists from Massachusetts
20th-century American zoologists